Greenwood Cemetery may refer to:
 Greenwood Cemetery (Montgomery, Alabama)
 Greenwood Cemetery (Orlando, Florida), a historic cemetery in Orlando, Florida
 Greenwood Cemetery (Tallahassee, Florida)
 Greenwood Cemetery (Atlanta), Georgia
 Greenwood Cemetery (Galena, Illinois)
 Greenwood Cemetery (Rockford, Illinois)
 Greenwood Cemetery Chapel, Muscatine, Iowa
 Greenwood Cemetery, New Orleans, Louisiana
 Greenwood Cemetery (Birmingham, Michigan)
 Greenwood Cemetery (Jackson, Mississippi)
 Greenwood Cemetery (Hillsdale, Missouri)
 Greenwood Cemetery, Boonton, New Jersey
 Green-Wood Cemetery, Brooklyn, New York
 Greenwood Cemetery (Hamilton, Ohio)
 Greenwood Cemetery (Philadelphia), Pennsylvania
 Greenwood Cemetery (Pittsburgh), Pennsylvania
 Old Greenwood Cemetery, Greenwood, South Carolina
 Greenwood Cemetery (Nashville, Tennessee)
 Greenwood Cemetery (Wheeling, West Virginia)
 Greenwood Cemetery (Dallas), Texas
 Greenwood Cemetery (Waco), Texas, a racially segregated cemetery

See also
 Greenwood (disambiguation)
 Greenwood Memorial Park (disambiguation)